Sabang Assembly constituency is an assembly constituency in Paschim Medinipur district in the Indian state of West Bengal.

Overview
As per orders of the Delimitation Commission, No. 226 Sabang Assembly constituency is composed of the following: Sabang community development block and Jalchak I, Jalchak II and Maligram gram panchayats of Pingla community development block.

Sabang Assembly constituency is part of No. 32 Ghatal (Lok Sabha constituency). It was earlier part of Panskura (Lok Sabha constituency).

Members of Legislative Assembly

Election results

2021

2017

2016
In the 2016 election, Manas Ranjan Bhunia of Congress defeated his nearest rival Nirmal Ghosh of Trinamool Congress.

 
 

.# Swing calculated on Congress+Trinamool Congress vote percentages taken together in 2006.

2011
In the 2011 election, Manas Ranjan Bhunia of Congress defeated his nearest rival Ram Pada Sahoo of CPI(M).

 
 

.# Swing calculated on Congress+Trinamool Congress vote percentages taken together in 2006.

1977-2006
In the 2006 state assembly elections, Manas Ranjan Bhunia of Congress won the Sabang assembly seat defeating his nearest rival Tushar Kanti Laya of CPI(M). Contests in most years were multi cornered but only winners and runners are being mentioned. Tushar Kanti Laya of CPI(M) defeated Manas Ranjan Bhunia of Congress in 2001 by 397 votes. A re-election was ordered by the Calcutta High Court, and Manas Ranjan Bunia won it. Makhan Lal Bangal, Independent, defeated Manas Bhunia of Congress in 1996. Manas Bhunia of Congress defeated Gouranga Samanta of CPI(M) in 1991, Hare Krishna Samanta of CPI(M) in 1987 and Hemanta Kumar Jana, Independent, in 1982. Gouranga Samanta of Biplobi Bangla Congress defeated Surya Kanta Mahapatra of Janata Party in 1977.

1951-1962
While Sabang constituency existed from 1951 to 1962, it did not exist from 1967 to 1972. Aditya Kumar Bakura of Congress won in 1962. Gopal Chandra Das Adhikary of Congress won in 1957 and 1952.

References

Assembly constituencies of West Bengal
Politics of Paschim Medinipur district